Bastien Chalureau (born 13 February 1992) is a French rugby union player, who currently plays as a lock for Montpellier in the Top 14 and the Heineken Champions Cup.

Early life
Born in Mondavezan, Haute-Garonne, Bastien Chalureau started rugby in Cazères and then joined Toulouse youth system in 2009.

Club career
On 5 March 2020, Chalureau joined Montpellier on a loan deal, and then signed permanently on 22 May. Thereafter, he won 2020–21 Challenge Cup and 2021–22 Top 14 with the Hérault side.

International career
On 7 November 2022, Chalureau was first called by Fabien Galthié to the France national team for the Autumn internationals.

Honours

Montpellier
 Top 14: 2021–22
 European Rugby Challenge Cup: 2020–21

References

External links
 France profile at FFR
 Montpellier Hérault Rugby
 EPCR
 All.Rugby
 It's Rugby

1992 births
People from Haute-Garonne
Living people
French rugby union players
Rugby union locks
USA Perpignan players
USON Nevers players
Stade Toulousain players
Montpellier Hérault Rugby players